Statistics of Úrvalsdeild in the 1930 season.

Overview
ÍBA did not enter in 1930 so the number of teams dropped to five again. Valur won the club's first championship.

League standings

Results

References

Úrvalsdeild karla (football) seasons
Iceland
Iceland
Urvalsdeild